Æbbe is an Anglo-Saxon female name. It may refer to:

 Saint Æbbe of Coldingham (c. 615–683) or Æbbe the Elder, abbess
 Saint Æbbe of Oxford, saint venerated in Oxfordshire
 Saint Æbbe of Minster-in-Thanet or Domne Eafe, 7th century abbess
 Saint Æbbe the Younger (died 870), abbess, whose existence is uncertain

See also
 Ebba (disambiguation)
 Ebbe, a given name and surname

Old English given names
Feminine given names